The following is a list of notable events and releases of the year 2013 in Norwegian music.

Events

January
 23 Bodø Jazz Open started in Bodø (January 23–27).
 25
 Nordlysfestivalen started in Tromsø (January 25 – February 2).
 Nils Anders Mortensen (piano) was awarded the Nordlysprisen 2013 at Nordlysfestivalen.
 31
 The Polarjazz Festival 2013 started in Longyearbyen (January 31 – February 7).
 31 – Kristiansund Opera Festival opened (January 31 – February 16).

February

March
 8 – Narvik Winter Festival started (March 8–17).
 22 – Vossajazz started at Voss (March 22–24).
 23
 Tore Brunborg was awarded Vossajazzprisen 2013 as well as the Buddyprisen 2012 at Vossajazz.
 Stian Carstensen performed the commissioned work Flipp for Vossajazz 2013.
 27 – Inferno Metal Festival 2014 started in Oslo (March 27–30).

April
 24 – SoddJazz 2013 started in Inderøy, Nord-Trøndelag (April 24–28).

May
 22 Festspillene i Bergen starts (May 22 – June 5)
 22 Nattjazz starts in Bergen (May 23 – June 1)

June
 12 – Bergenfest 2013 started in Bergen (June 12–15).
 13 – Norwegian Wood 2013 started in Oslo, Norway (June 13–16).

July
 3 – Kongsberg Jazzfestival started (July 3 – 6).
 7 – Lofoten Piano Festival started in Lofoten (July 7–12).
 15 Moldejazz starts in Molde with Jason Moran as artist in residence (July 15–20).

August
 12 – Oslo Jazzfestival started in Oslo (August 12–17).
 13 – Erlend Skomsvoll was recipient of the Ella-prisen 2013 at the Oslo Jazzfestival.

September
 5 – Ultima Oslo Contemporary Music Festival 2014 starts in Oslo (September 5–14).
 6 – Punktfestivalen started in Kristiansand (September 6–8).

October
 24 – The 12th Insomnia Festival started in Tromsø (October 24–26).
 25 – The 10th Ekkofestival started in Bergen (October 25 – November 3).
 29 – The Oslo World Music Festival started in Oslo (October 29 – November 3).

November
 13 – The Vardø Blues Festival (Blues i Vintermørket) started (November 13 – 17).
 21 – The 8th Barents Jazz, Tromsø International Jazz Festival started (November 21 – 24).

December
 11 – The Nobel Peace Prize Concert was held at Telenor Arena.

Albums released

January

February

March

April

May

June

July

August

September
{|class="wikitable"
|-
!Day
!Album
!Artist
!Label
!Notes
!Ref.
|-
| rowspan="1" style="text-align:center;"|6
| Ville Ord
| Frida Ånnevik
| Grappa
| Recipient of the Spellemannprisen lyricist award
| style="text-align:center;"|
|-
| rowspan="2" style="text-align:center;"|9
| Duolia
| Duplex
| NorCD
| 
| style="text-align:center;"|
|-
| Sketches of ...
| Duplex
| NorCD
| 
| style="text-align:center;"|
|-
| rowspan="1" style="text-align:center;"|11
| Logic
| Mopti
| Ocean Sound Recordings
| 
| style="text-align:center;"|
|-
| rowspan="2" style="text-align:center;"|20
| Russian Dream
| Andrea Kvintett
| NorCD
| 
| style="text-align:center;"|<ref>{{cite web |url=http://bigdipper.no/vinyl/jazz/lp/andrea-kvintett-russian-dream-ep-10-norcd1328lp-p0000002844 |title=Andrea Kvintett – Russian Dream EP (10) |publisher=BigDipper.no |accessdate=2018-02-08}}</ref>
|-
| The Forester| Susanna and Ensemble neoN
| SusannaSonata
| Produced by Deathprod and Susanna
| style="text-align:center;"|
|}

October

November

December

Unknown date
#

F

New Artists
 Monica Heldal received the Spellemannprisen award, as 'Best newcomer of the year 2013', for the album Boy From The North'' and was with that also recipient of the Gramo grant.

Deaths

January
 14 – Morten Mølster, rock guitarist, The September When (born 1962).
 25 – Aase Nordmo Løvberg, opera singer (born 1923).

February
 1 – Dag Schjelderup-Ebbe, musicologist, contemporary classical composer, music critic and biographer (born 1926).
 5 – Egil Hovland, contemporary classical composer (born 1924).
 8 – Knut Nesbø, rock and folk guitarist, Di Derre (born 1961).

March
 18 – Eivind Rølles, guitarist and pop singer, The Monroes, cancer (born 1959).

April
 17 – Yngve Moe, jazz and rock bass guitarist, Dance with a Stranger, fell in coma, after drowning in Tenerife, Spain (born 1957).

 May
 19 – Anders Vangen, operatic singer (born 1960).

July
 1 – Rolf Graf, jazz-rock bass guitarist, Lava, cancer (born 1960).
 29 – Ole Henrik Moe, classical pianist, art historian and critic (born 1920).

August
 18 – Rolv Wesenlund, comedian, singer, jazz clarinetist and saxophonist, writer, and actor (born 1936).
 29 – Kjell Lund, architect, songwriter and singer (born 1927).

September
 17 – Alex Naumik, Lithuanian-born artist, songwriter and record producer (born 1949).
 24 – Sverre Bruland, classical conductor and trumpeter (born 1923).
 26 – Arnstein Johansen, accordionist (born 1925).

October
 2 – Kaare Ørnung, classical pianist, entertainer and music teacher (born 1931).
 19 – Lage Fosheim, pop singer, The Monroes, cancer (born 1958).

See also
 2013 in Norway
 Music of Norway
 Norway in the Eurovision Song Contest 2013

References

 
Norwegian music
Norwegian
Music
2010s in Norwegian music